Enuani is an Igbo dialect spoken in Nigeria by the Igbo people of Delta State, Onitsha, Obosi and Ogbaru in Anambra State, Mgbidi in Imo State, Ndoni in Rivers State and some parts of Ibaji in Delta state. The Enuani dialect is generally similar to the Igbo dialect of Anambra State. Enuani is tonal like the rest of Anioma dialects and is particularly related to the standard Igbo pronunciation in many regards. The Enuani dialect is the dominant Igbo dialect in Delta State.

Enuani Communities. 
Enuani is one of the four major Igbo dialects spoken by the Anioma people (predominantly based in Aniocha and Oshimili Areas) in Delta north. The area of concentration of these people mostly comprises Akukwu -igbo, Asaba, Ashaba Ubulu-uno, Ejeme-Aniogo, Egbudu-Akah, Ibusa, Idumuje-Uno, Idumuje-Ugboko, Illah, Issele-Azagba, Issele-Uku, Ogwashi-Uku, Ugbodu, Okpanam, Oko communities, Onicha-Ugbo, Onicha-Uku, Idumu - Ogo, Onicha-Olona, Ukwunzu,  Ubulu-uno, Ubulu-Uku, Ubulu-okiti, Ukala Okpunor, Ukala Okwute  and the rest of them. This dialect as spoken in all of these areas are homogeneous in accent and mutually intelligible. It is also remarkable that this dialect has natural standardized orthography and has gained wider acceptance linguistically.

This dialect is the lingua franca of the indigenous people within the communities in Aniocha South, Aniocha North, Oshimili South and Oshimili North Local Government Areas of Delta State. These communities have similar customs and traditions, values and inter community relationships. They consider themselves to have the same origin and ancestral roots, which informs their believe that they are brothers and sisters. These communities also share boundaries and economic activities. The community leaders are known as the Obi of the community.

References 

Languages of Nigeria
Igbo language